Alexandra Flores (5 years old) was murdered by David Santiago Renteria (born November 22, 1969) on November 18–19, 2001 in El Paso, Texas, after being kidnapped. She was last with her parents in a local Walmart.

Cause of death  
The medical examiner testified that Flores had two bruises to her skull, which indicated that she was struck on both sides of her head. A burned plastic bag was also found covering Flores's head. The examiner concluded that Flores died from "asphyxia due to manual strangulation" and that "she was dead when she was burned." He also found no evidence of sexual assault but did not dispel the possibility that she was touched.

Evidence against Renteria  
DNA sampling of the blood that was found in Renteria's van was the same as Flores' DNA.

Background of Renteria  
Renteria had a history with law enforcement before the Flores murder. In 1992 he was convicted of the offense of indecency with a child. In the course of the Flores trial, the victim of the 1992 incident testified that Renteria molested her at the age of 7. Renteria was a convicted sex offender on probation when he was seen on a Walmart security video leaving the store with Flores.

Conviction  
Renteria was convicted of capital murder and sentenced to death in September 2003. Renteria has appealed his sentence multiple times, and each time, his sentence of capital murder is reinforced.

See also
List of kidnappings

References  

2001 in Texas
2001 murders in the United States
Deaths by person in Texas
Deaths by strangulation in the United States
Female murder victims
History of El Paso, Texas
Murdered American children
November 2001 events in the United States
People murdered in Texas